Wratislaus of Brno (died August/September 1156) was the Duke of Moravia for twenty years - in 1125–1129 and 1130–1156 (4+26 years - the second stage 1130–1156)). He was the first son and successor of Ulrich I, Duke of Brno (+1092) and unknown princess (probably Slavic origin). He did not succeed as half monarch of Moravia (diarch), for all half of Moravia (the west one) as his father Ulrich I, but Brno was already divided into two parts: Brno and Znojmo and his father Ulrich was co-monarch in this part with his uncle Luitpold of Znojmo. Both brothers together later established a benedictine cloister and its St. Procopius Basilica in Třebíč and prepared as mausoleum for Brno-Znojmo branch House of Přemyslid. Wratislaus himself probably initiated the establishment of the Royal cathedral chapter of St. Peter and Paul in Brno, formally created later in 1292.
He had long ruled over Moravia (as diarch in Brno) for 20 years, once interrupted by illegitimate regency: (1128-1130 by Soběslav I)
By his marriage(1132) to a Russian princess, he probably had two (three ?) children:

 Spytihněv of Brno (or), Duke of Moravia from 1125 to 1129 and from 1130 to his death in 1146
 Svatopluk of Brno (?),(or) Prince of Jemnice (?)
 Agnes (?) 1197
He was succeeded legitimately as prince of Brno by his son Spitihněv of Brno (1146)

Domestic policy 

Wratislaus initially ruled in the Brno part (the western one) of the duchy of Moravia, until 1129 when they were evicted illegitimately by Bretislaus II. Later (1130) they enforced a return of the Brno part of the Moravian duchy -  according to the principles of agnatic seniority. After they returned to the duchy of Brno, the brothers divided it into two subparts named Brno (principality) and Znojmo (principality), where they continued to reign in certain local territorial union. In 1104 his father and uncle together founded a Benedictine abbey in Třebíč whose convent church of St. Procopius was intended as their own dynastic mausoleum where they were both buried.

Moravian lines of Přemysl dynasty as a whole were systematically associated with dynastic marriages with princesses of major royal and ducal dynasties, members of Brno line were associated Rurik dynasty, specially Wratislaus was 1132 spoused with princess of House of Rurik Members of the Moravian dynasty were fully predisposed to take over the central throne (for both countries - Bohemia and Moravia) in Prague, under the principles of agnatic seniority.

Family tree

Ancestry

See also
 Moravia
 History of Moravia
 Margraviate of Moravia
 Lands of the Bohemian Crown
 Ducal Rotunda of the Virgin Mary and St Catherine
 Conrad Otto of Znojmo

Citations and notes

References

Bibliography
 COSMAS, (Canonicus Pragensis); Chronica Boëmorum. (Latin)
 COSMAS of Prague, (Canon of Prague), Translated by Lisa Wolverton (2009); Chronicle of the Czechs (Chronicle of Bohemias).  The Catholic university of America Press. (English)
 KRZEMIEŃSKA, Barbara; MERAHAUTOVÁ, Anežka; TŘEŠTÍK, Dušan (2000). Moravští Přemyslovci ve Znojemské rotundě. Praha: SetOut. 135 p. . (in Czech)
 WOLVERTON, Lisa (2001). Hastening toward Prague. Philadelphia, University of Pennsylvania Press.   (English)
 REITINGER, Lukáš. Nekrologia kláštera Pegau. Pozapomenuté svědectví o Přemyslovcích (nejen) Kosmova věku. In: WIHODA, Martin; REITINGER, Lukáš (2010). Proměna středovýchodní Evropy raného a vrcholného středověku. Brno : Matice moravská, . . p. 373-374 (in Czech)
 GROSMANNOVÁ, Dagmar (2010). Medieval Coinage in Moravia. In: GALUŠKA, Luděk; MITÁČEK, Jiří; NOVOTNÁ Lea. Treasures of Moravia. Brno: Moravian Museum Press. . p. 371-374 (English)
 MOLECZ, P. (2003):Die Hanthaler-Fälschungen im Lilielnfelder Nekrolog am Beispiel der Schwestern des Heiligen Leopold. Eine Beitrag zur Barocken Wischenschaftsgeschichte und Babenbergergenealogie. MIÖG 111, p. 241-284, exact 360–365. (in German)
 WIHODA, Martin. Morava v době knížecí 906–1197. Praha : Nakladatelství Lidové noviny, 2010. 464 s. .
 MĚCHUROVÁ, Zdeňka (2010). From the medieval history of Moravia. In: GALUŠKA, Luděk; MITÁČEK, Jiří; NOVOTNÁ Lea. Treasures of Moravia. Brno: Moravian Museum Press. . p. 107-115 (English)

External links 
MORAVIA, dukes and margraves genealogy tables  
The Ducal Rotunda of the Virgin Mary and St Catherine web page  
The Ducal Rotunda in Znojmo - A virtual tour  
Moravia dukes - Ulrich of Brno part  
 

Roman Catholic monarchs
People from Brno
Přemyslid dynasty
Younger sons of dukes
1156 deaths
Year of birth unknown